Lisa Lindgren Farrer (July 28, 1960 – July 15, 2005) was an American actress, not to be confused with the Swedish actress of the same name. She played Kelly Gardner in the short-lived CBS situation comedy Another Day in 1978, Kathy Summers in the daytime serial General Hospital in 1980, and Cindy Spooner in Hill Street Blues in 1981. She also lent her voice to the character Tess Darret in the 1984 CBS cartoon series Pole Position. She also made guest appearances on CHiPs, Joanie Loves Chachi, Alice, and The Waltons.

References

External links

1960 births
2005 deaths
American television actresses
20th-century American actresses
20th-century American women
21st-century American women